Robert Lee Warlick (March 20, 1941 – September 6, 2005) was an American professional basketball player.

Warlick was born in Hickory, North Carolina, and attended Ridgeview High School. The 6'5" guard/forward played at Pueblo Junior College in Colorado, then transferred to Pepperdine University in 1961. At Pepperdine, he helped the school reach the NCAA Tournament after a season in which he averaged 16.4 points and 9.6 rebounds. Warlick then played professionally in the NBA and ABA as a member of the Detroit Pistons, San Francisco Warriors, Milwaukee Bucks, Phoenix Suns, and Los Angeles Stars. He averaged 7.9 points per game in his professional career, which was cut short by a knee injury.

Warlick later worked for Purex Industries, then established the Youth Sports Foundation in Long Beach, California. He died of a heart attack in 2005.

Warlick's brother, Ernie Warlick, played football for the Buffalo Bills.

Career statistics

NBA

Regular season

|-
| align="left" | 1965–66
| align="left" | Detroit
| 10 || - || 7.8 || .289 || - || .333 || 1.6 || 1.0 || - || - || 2.4
|-
| align="left" | 1966–67
| align="left" | San Francisco
| 12 || - || 5.4 || .288 || - || .545 || 1.7 || 0.8 || - || - || 3.0
|-
| align="left" | 1967–68
| align="left" | San Francisco
| 69 || - || 19.1 || .421 || - || .567 || 3.8 || 2.3 || - || - || 8.9
|-
| align="left" | 1968–69
| align="left" | Milwaukee
| 3 || - || 7.3 || .125 || - || .800 || 0.3 || 0.3 || - || - || 2.0
|-
| align="left" | 1968–69
| align="left" | Phoenix
| 63 || - || 15.5 || .423 || - || .606 || 2.4 || 2.1 || - || - || 8.0
|- class="sortbottom"
| style="text-align:center;" colspan="2"| Career
| 157 || - || 15.7 || .410 || - || .582 || 2.9 || 2.0 || - || - || 7.5
|}

Playoffs

|-
| align="left" | 1966–67
| align="left" | San Francisco
| 2 || - || 4.0 || .000 || - || .000 || 0.0 || 0.5 || - || - || 0.0
|-
| align="left" | 1967–68
| align="left" | San Francisco
| 10 || - || 22.6 || .466 || - || .757 || 5.3 || 2.4 || - || - || 13.8
|- class="sortbottom"
| style="text-align:center;" colspan="2"| Career
| 12 || - || 19.5 || .458 || - || .757 || 4.4 || 2.1 || - || - || 11.5
|}

ABA

Regular season

|-
| align="left" | 1969–70
| align="left" | Los Angeles
| 29 || - || 24.5 || .362 || .000 || .677 || 3.9 || 2.6 || - || - || 10.0
|- class="sortbottom"
| style="text-align:center;" colspan="2"| Career
| 29 || - || 24.5 || .362 || .000 || .677 || 3.9 || 2.6 || - || - || 10.0
|}

College

|-
| align="left" | 1961–62
| align="left" | Pepperdine
| 27 || - || - || .418 || - || .638 || 9.7 || - || - || - || 16.4
|-
| align="left" | 1962–63
| align="left" | Pepperdine
| 25 || - || - || .446 || - || .643 || 13.0 || - || - || - || 17.2
|- class="sortbottom"
| style="text-align:center;" colspan="2"| Career
| 52 || - || - || .431 || - || .641 || 11.3 || - || - || - || 16.8
|}

References

1941 births
2005 deaths
American men's basketball players
CSU Pueblo ThunderWolves men's basketball players
Detroit Pistons players
Junior college men's basketball players in the United States
Los Angeles Stars players
Milwaukee Bucks players
Pepperdine Waves men's basketball players
Phoenix Suns players
San Francisco Warriors players
Undrafted National Basketball Association players